William George Feaster (1904-December 11, 1950) was an American professional football player who spent  two season in the National Football League with the Orange Tornadoes and the Newark Tornadoes from 1929 to 1930. Feaster appeared in 22 career games, while making 20 starts.

References

1904 births
1950 deaths
Fordham University alumni
Orange Tornadoes players
Newark Tornadoes players